Southern Brittany University is a French university, in the Academy of Rennes. The University is separated in three different campus : Lorient , Vannes and Pontivy.

Notable people
Faculty
 Olga Novo (born 1975, in Vilarmao, A Pobra do Brollón) - Galician poet and essayist

Alumni
 Gwendal Rouillard (born 1976) - politician (LREM) 

Recipient of honorary degree
 Sabu Thomas (born 1962) - Indian professor; vice-chancellor of Mahatma Gandhi University, Kerala

See also
 List of public universities in France by academy

References

Educational institutions established in 1995
1995 establishments in France
Lorient
Education in Brittany
Universities in Brittany